James Worthington may refer to:
 Jimmy Worthington, British swimmer
 James Worthington (rugby league), English rugby league player